Ys vs. Trails in the Sky: Alternative Saga is a 2010 crossover fighting game developed and published by Nihon Falcom. Similar to the concept of Super Smash Bros. and Dissidia Final Fantasy, the game involves players choosing a character and participating in up to four-player fights against other characters sourced from Falcom's Ys and Trails role-playing game series. It released only in Japan for the PlayStation Portable on July 29.

Gameplay
Ys vs. Trails in the Sky plays as a crossover fighting game, similar in concept the Super Smash Bros., Dissidia Final Fantasy, and Tales of VS, in which the player chooses characters taken from a series and directs them in a fight against characters from other franchises. It takes its roster from two of Nihon Falcom's series, Ys and Trails, and is played from a top-down perspective.

The game contains a story mode, where a player goes through a series of battles while experiencing story sequences in between. Five separate difficulty settings are available. Additionally, local multiplayer of up to four players is also available via an ad hoc connection. Battles may be played both competitively and cooperatively.

Characters
The game's roster of playable characters consists of characters from the Ys and Trails series. From Ys, there is Adol Christin, Dogi, Elk, Mishera, Aisha, Geis, Cruxie, and Chester Stoddart. From Trails, there is Estelle Bright, Joshua Astray, Tita Russell, Agate Crosner, Olivier Lenheim, Kloe Rinz, Renne, Leonhardt, and Lloyd Bannings.

The game also employees a support character system, which entails choosing a computer-controlled character who temporarily assists the character. Some of these characters come from other Falcom games, such as Jurio and Chris from The Legend of Heroes II: Prophecy of the Moonlight Witch, Dela from Brandish, and Gurumins from Gurumin.

Development
Ys vs. Trails in the Sky was first announced in an issue of Dengeki PlayStation in November 2009. The game was created due to Nihon Falcom's desire to make use of the PlayStation Portable's wireless ad hoc local multiplayer function, something they had not been able to work into prior JRPG titles. They also felt that both series, Trails and Ys, while JRPGs, both had many themes in them related to battle and conflict that they felt lent to a natural transition to a fighting game. The game's engine was based on the one first used in Ys Seven. The game contains the full Japanese voice acting. Additionally, the game's music was a combination of original compositions and arrangements of tracks from the Ys and Trails games.

Ys vs. Trails in the Sky was released in Japan on July 29, 2010. In addition to the standard version, a special limited edition was also released, which in addition to the game, contained the game's soundtrack, an album of selected music from Falcom's library, a special booklet of game information, and special card for a promotional Victory Spark trading card game. Website Siliconera had speculated that the game would be likely to get an English localization due to Xseed Games's relationship with Falcom, Falcom's stated intention to focus further on Western markets around 2010, and the fact that the game would be a smaller undertaking to translate than the typical text-heavy JRPG. A fan translation patch by the group Geofront was released on October 16, 2021.

Reception and sales
The game debuted eighth on the Media Create Japanese video game charts, selling 30,047 copies in its opening week, and seventh on the Famitsu charts. The game was one of many in the release week that IGN cited as being drivers in PSP hardware as well, with the system itself doubling the sales of its prior week. The game sold well enough to warrant a "The Best" budget re-release in July 2011.

Notes

References

External links
 

2010 video games
Fighting games
Japan-exclusive video games
The Legend of Heroes
Trails (series)
Ys (series)
PlayStation Portable games
PlayStation Portable-only games
Video games developed in Japan
Crossover fighting games
Multiplayer and single-player video games
Nihon Falcom games